The Moscow Province - province of Moscow Governorate of the Russian Empire, which existed 1719–1775. Its center was the city of Moscow.

Moscow province was formed as part of the Moscow gubernya by decree of Peter the Great in 1719. The cities of Moscow, Borisovo, Borovsk, Vereya, Volokolamsk, Dmitrov, Zvenigorod, Kashira, Klin, Kolomna, Maloyaroslavets, Mozhaysk, Ruza, Serpukhov with Obolensk and Tarusa counties were included in the province.

In November 1775, the division of gubernyas into provinces was abolished.

References 

Provinces of the Russian Empire
States and territories established in 1719
States and territories disestablished in 1775
History of Moscow